The participation of Thailand in the ABU TV Song Festival has occurred twice since the inaugural ABU TV Song Festival began in 2012. Since their début in 2013, the Thai entry has been organised by the national broadcaster Thai Public Broadcasting Service (TPBS). In 2015, Thailand withdrew from the festival.

History
TPBS made their debut in the ABU TV Song Festivals at the 2013 festival, in Hanoi, Vietnam.

Participation overview 

 Entry intended, but later withdrew.

References 

Countries at the ABU Song Festival
Thai music